B. flavescens may refer to:

 Bachia flavescens, a spectacled lizard
 Baritius flavescens, a Brazilian moth
 Bembicium flavescens, a sea snail
 Bembix flavescens, a sand wasp
 Berchemia flavescens, a climbing plant
 Bittacus flavescens, a hanging fly
 Boissonneaua flavescens, a South American hummingbird
 Bombus flavescens, a social insect
 Brachodes flavescens, an Italian moth
 Brachyopa flavescens, a flower fly
 Bulbophyllum flavescens, a flowering plant